Zdravko Radić (born June 24, 1979 in Kotor) is a Montenegrin water polo player. He was a member of the Montenegro men's national water polo team at the 2008 Summer Olympics.

See also
 Montenegro men's Olympic water polo team records and statistics
 List of men's Olympic water polo tournament goalkeepers
 List of world champions in men's water polo
 List of World Aquatics Championships medalists in water polo

References

External links
 

1979 births
Living people
Montenegrin male water polo players
Water polo goalkeepers
Olympic water polo players of Montenegro
Water polo players at the 2008 Summer Olympics
Water polo players at the 2016 Summer Olympics
World Aquatics Championships medalists in water polo